Vear is a village in Vestfold, Norway, located in the municipality of Tønsberg. It had a population of 3,520 in 2005. Vear lies near the border between Stokke (Sandefjord) and Tønsberg. It lies along Norwegian County Road 303 between Sandefjord and Tønsberg. It has a total area, including land- and water, of 3.55 km2. It is located 6 km south of Tønsberg, and 20 km north of Sandefjord city centre. The combined populations of Vear, Hognes, Bjelland, and Smørberg is 3,800 people as of 2015.

Although Stokke municipality decided to merge into Sandefjord on January 1, 2017, Vear residents decided to leave Stokke in order to merge into neighboring Tønsberg. Turnout for the ballot was big with 72.9 percent of eligible voters. 63.8 percent of Vear residents decided to transfer to Tønsberg, while 34.1 percent preferred to follow Stokke into Sandefjord municipality. Vear is home to 2,500 residents, which made up 22 percent of Stokke's total population prior to the merge.

The village was for long straddling the Tønsberg-Stokke border, and certain parts of town were located in Tønsberg rather than in Stokke. Stokke established an elementary- and middle school at Vear in 1974, while Tønsberg established an elementary school at Hogsnes fifteen years later, less than 900 meters from the previous school. Vear and neighboring Hogsnes have grown together and make up one residential community.

References

External links

Villages in Vestfold og Telemark
Tønsberg